Omphalapion is a genus of pear-shaped weevils in the family of beetles known as Brentidae. There are about five described species in Omphalapion.

Species
These five species belong to the genus Omphalapion:
 Omphalapion beuthini (An.Hoffmann, 1874) g
 Omphalapion buddebergi (Bedel, 1887) g
 Omphalapion hookerorum (W. Kirby, 1808) g b
 Omphalapion pseudodispar Wanat, 1995 g
 Omphalapion rhodopense (Angelov, 1962) g
Data sources: i = ITIS, c = Catalogue of Life, g = GBIF, b = Bugguide.net

References

Further reading

External links

 

Brentidae